The 62nd Filmfare Awards South ceremony honouring the winners and nominees of the best of South Indian cinema in 2014 was an event held on 26 June 2015 at the Nehru Indoor Stadium in Chennai.

Awards and nominees

Main awards
Winners are listed first, highlighted in boldface.

Kannada cinema

Malayalam cinema

Tamil cinema

Telugu cinema

Technical Awards

Special awards

References

Specific

External links
 
 

Filmfare Awards South
2014 Indian film awards